Holly Hills is a neighborhood located in South St. Louis, Missouri, near the intersection of I-55 and Loughborough Avenue. The neighborhood is defined by Bates and Walsh on the Northeast, Holly Hills on the Southwest, Morganford St on the Northwest, and Grand Boulevard on the Southeast. It is surrounded by Carondelet Park and the Boulevard Heights, Bevo Mill, Dutchtown and Carondelet neighborhoods.

Demographics

In 2020 Holly Hills was 67.5% White, 16.8% Black, 0.5% Native American, 3.2% Asian, 8.6% Two or More Races, and 3.4% Some Other Race. 8.0% of the population was of Hispanic or Latino origin.

See also
Neighborhoods of St. Louis

References

External links
 Official site
 Carondelet Park

Neighborhoods in St. Louis